Cheryomushki is a rural locality (a settlement) in Navlinsky District, Bryansk Oblast, Russia. The population was 52 as of 2010. There is 1 street.

Geography 
Cheryomushki is located 20 km north of Navlya (the district's administrative centre) by road. Pakhar is the nearest rural locality.

References 

Rural localities in Navlinsky District